Chirunavvula Varamistava is a 1993 Indian Telugu-language romance film, written and directed by N. H. Chandra. The film stars Vikram and Rani. It was dubbed and released in Tamil as Vicky in 2002, shortly after the success of Gemini, in which the lead pair had featured. The Tamil version featured the song "Yentabagundi Basu" from Chala Bagundi and an additional song featuring Raju Sundaram and Ramya Krishnan.

Plot 
Vicky (Vikram), the son of a leading litigator, meets Vijaya (Rani), at college. They both initially clash with one another, however soon after Vicky falls in love with Vijaya, but Vijaya continues to resent him. In order, to win Vijaya's love Vicky ends up playing a trick; blowing out of proportion the stomach ache he gets and makes her believe that he has got cancer. On his father's insistence, taking pity on him, Vijaya agrees to act as if though she loves Vicky, just to make him happy while he is alive.

Cast 
 Vikram as Vicky
 Rani as Vijaya
 G. Maruti Rao
 Murali Mohan
 Annapoorna
 Babu Mohan

Production 
The film began production shortly after Meera. Vikram switched to Telugu films as he didn't get any successes in Tamil films.

Soundtrack 
The soundtrack album is composed by Vidyasagar. Vidyasagar later reused "Okate Korika" as "Malare Mounama" for Karna (1995).

References 

1990s romance films
1990s Telugu-language films
1993 films
Films scored by Vidyasagar
Indian romance films